Kikijan – is an Azerbaijani folk dance. The Azerbaijani composer Afrasiyab Badalbeyli used the melody of the dance in “The Maiden Tower” ballet composed by him.

References

Azerbaijani dances